Where the Stress Falls, published in 2001, is the last collection of essays published by Susan Sontag before her death in 2004. The essays vary between her experiences in the theater ("Waiting for Godot in Sarajevo") to book reviews.

Reception
Where the Stress Falls has been praised by literary critics.  Publishers Weekly lauded Sontag as "first and foremost an essayist" and wrote, "Sontag's appetite for trends and achievements is still so fierce, and she switches subjects so quickly and lithely, that if one short essay does not convince, the next one probably will."  The book was also praised by P. D. Smith of The Guardian, who wrote, "An eclectic volume, it is unified by Sontag's tireless interrogation of the aesthetic impulse and by her passion for ideas, culture and especially for writing."

Conversely, the collection was heavily criticized by William Deresiewicz of The New York Times, who opined, "While Where the Stress Falls won't do much to enhance her stature as a thinker, never before has she made such large claims for her moral pre-eminence, her exemplary fulfillment of the intellectual's mission as society's conscience. In effect, she's the first person in a long while to nominate herself so publicly for sainthood."  He added:

References

2001 non-fiction books
Books of literary criticism
English-language books
American essay collections
Works by Susan Sontag